Hippopotamyrus is a genus of elephantfish in the family Mormyridae.

Species 
There are currently 11 recognized species in this genus:

 Hippopotamyrus ansorgii (Boulenger 1905) (Slender stonebasher)
 Hippopotamyrus castor Pappenheim 1906 (Lokundi mormyrid)
 Hippopotamyrus grahami (Norman 1928) (Graham's stonebasher)
 Hippopotamyrus harringtoni (Boulenger 1905) (Harrington's stonebasher)
 Hippopotamyrus longilateralis B. J. Kramer & Swartz 2010 (Cunene River stonebasher)
 Hippopotamyrus macroterops (Boulenger 1920)
 Hippopotamyrus pappenheimi (Boulenger 1910) (Pappenheim's stonebasher)
 Hippopotamyrus paugyi Lévêque & Bigorne 1985 (Kolente stonebasher)
 Hippopotamyrus pictus (Marcusen 1864) (Marcusen's mormyrid)
 Hippopotamyrus szaboi B. J. Kramer, van der Bank & Wink 2004 (Upper Zambezi mormyrid)
 Hippopotamyrus weeksii (Boulenger 1902) (Weeks' mormyrid)

Distribution
Some of the species within this genus have rather restricted distribution. For example, H. longilateralis occurs only in the Kunene River of southern Africa.

References

Mormyridae
Ray-finned fish genera
Taxonomy articles created by Polbot